Paidia cinerascens is a moth of the family Erebidae. It was described by Gottlieb August Wilhelm Herrich-Schäffer in 1847. It is found in Asia Minor, Greece and on Crete.

The wingspan is 30–31 mm.

Subspecies
Paidia cinerascens cinerascens
Paidia cinerascens palaestinensis Amsel, 1935

References

Nudariina
Moths described in 1847